Bas Tietema (born 29 January 1995) is a Dutch cyclist, who currently rides for UCI Continental team .

Career
Tietema originally played football in his childhood, but began cycling in 2010. After a fairly successful junior and under-23 career, Tietema retired from competition in 2019 due to skin allergies and loss of motivation. He then started a YouTube channel known as Tour de Tietema, where he uploads cycling videos with friends Josse Wester and Devin van der Wiel. As of May 2022, the channel has more than 133,000 subscribers. In 2021, the group started an amateur team known as the Tour de Tietema Cycling Team, as a challenge to attempt to win local races. Tietema gained back his desire to race, and then came in contact with UCI ProTeam  after reportedly seeing improvements in his fitness. In February 2022, he returned to professional cycling after officially joining .

Major results

2013
 Keizer der Juniores
1st Mountains classification
1st Stage 1
 4th Overall Ronde des Vallées
1st Stage 2 (ITT)
 6th Overall Driedaagse van Axel
 7th Grand Prix Bati-Metallo
2014
 3rd Paris–Roubaix Espoirs
2015
 10th Paris–Roubaix Espoirs
2016
 8th Overall Tour de Berlin
1st Prologue (TTT)
2017
 Tour Alsace
1st Points classification
1st Combativity classification
1st Km 70 classification
 3rd Time trial, National Under-23 Road Championships

References

External links

1995 births
Living people
Dutch male cyclists
Sportspeople from Zwolle
Dutch YouTubers
Cyclists from Overijssel
21st-century Dutch people